Johannes ("Jan") Daniel de Natris (13 November 1895 in Amsterdam – 16 September 1972 in Amsterdam) was a football (soccer) player from the Netherlands, who represented his home country at both the 1920 Summer Olympics in Antwerp, Belgium and the 1924 Summer Olympics in Paris, France.

Career
In 1920, he won the bronze medal with the Netherlands national football team. De Natris obtained a total number of 23 caps for Holland in the 1920s, and played for Ajax Amsterdam, Vitesse Arnhem and De Spartaan.

Career statistics

International

References

External links
 

1895 births
1972 deaths
Dutch footballers
Footballers at the 1920 Summer Olympics
Footballers at the 1924 Summer Olympics
Olympic footballers of the Netherlands
Olympic bronze medalists for the Netherlands
AFC Ajax players
SBV Vitesse players
Footballers from Amsterdam
Netherlands international footballers
Olympic medalists in football
Medalists at the 1920 Summer Olympics
Association football forwards